Robert Allanson (1735–1773) was a British architect from York. He designed Pencarrow house in Cornwall, a Palladian mansion built for the Molesworth family in 1765–75.

References

1735 births
1773 deaths
People from York
18th-century English architects
Architects from Yorkshire